Shmuel Rodensky (10 December 1902 – 16 July 1989) was a Russian-born Israeli actor whose stage, film, and television career in Israel and West Germany spanned six decades. He immigrated to Mandatory Palestine in 1924 and studied drama at the Eretz Israel Theatre in Tel Aviv. After performing with several theatre companies between 1928 and 1948, he joined Habima Theatre in 1949 and became one of its principal players. He was known as "the Israeli Laurence Olivier". In 1968 Rodensky traveled to Hamburg to join the German-language production of Fiddler on the Roof (titled Anatevka), playing the lead role of Tevye the Dairyman. He performed this role more than 1,400 times throughout West Germany and Switzerland. His notable film roles include the lead in the 1968 Israeli film Tevye and His Seven Daughters, Simon Wiesenthal in the 1974 Anglo-German film The Odessa File, and Jethro in the 1974 BBC television miniseries Moses the Lawgiver. He was the recipient of numerous honors in both Israel and West Germany, including the Federal Service Cross from the Federal Republic of Germany and the Israel Prize.

Early life
Shmuel Rodensky was born in Smorgon, Russian Empire,  in 1902. During World War I he fled to Ukraine, but was expelled from the country during the Russian Revolution. He then traveled to Poland, entered Hamburg, Germany, on a forged Polish passport, and finally immigrated to Mandatory Palestine in 1924.

Stage career

In his early years in Mandatory Palestine, Rodensky was employed in draining swamps, field work, and construction. He studied at the studio of drama at the Eretz Israel Theatre in Tel Aviv and performed with a number of theatre companies between 1928 and 1948, including the Eretz Israel Theatre, Hakumkum (The Kettle), and Hamatate (The Broom). In 1949 he responded to a newspaper advertisement seeking new performers at the Habima Theatre in Tel Aviv and became one of that theatre's principal players.  He was known as "the Israeli Laurence Olivier".

At Habima, Rodensky performed a wide variety of dramatic roles, including Iago in Othello and the cardinal in The Deputy. He also performed satire, as in Ephraim Kishon's 1953 play Yiddishpiel.

Rodensky formed several artistic partnerships. He and another Habima actor named Shmuel, Shmuel Segal, created a Yiddish-speaking comedic team called The Shmuliks; they were later joined by a third Habima actor, Shmuel Atzmon. The Three Shmuliks performed in Israel and abroad. In 1985, The Three Shmuliks were part of the Israeli delegation of actors, writers, and public figures invited by the Polish government to the 35th-anniversary celebration of the Yiddish State Theater in Warsaw. With Segal and another Habima actor named Goldenberg, Rodensky was also a member of Die Kleine Mentshalach ("The Little People"), a Yiddish-language trio that performed dramatic readings of works by Sholem Aleichem. Rodensky formed a third, satirical trio with Jacob Timen and Esther Gamlielit of Hamatate (The Broom Theater).

Tevye the Dairyman
In 1965, Rodensky replaced Bomba Tzur in the role of Tevye the Dairyman in the second year of the Israeli production of the musical Fiddler on the Roof, staged at the Godik Theater. Rodensky went on to appear in 350 performances in Israel. During a 10–week absence due to illness, Rodensky was replaced by Chaim Topol, launching Topol's own career as Tevye on stage and screen. Rodensky briefly acted in a Yiddish-language production of the musical which was not as successful as the Hebrew-language ones. Rodensky reprised the role of Tevye on screen in the 1968 Israeli film Tevye and His Seven Daughters.

In 1968 Rodensky traveled to Hamburg to join the German-language production of Fiddler on the Roof, titled Anatevka, which premiered on February 1. Rodensky became popular throughout West Germany for his portrayal of Tevye, performing the role more than 1,400 times. He also toured with a production in Switzerland. He appeared on the German-language recording of the Hamburg premiere.

On September 4, 1972, the evening before a Palestinian terrorist group infiltrated the Israeli Olympic athletes' quarters during the 1972 Summer Olympics in Munich, the Israeli team attended a German-language performance of Fiddler on the Roof at the Deutsches Theater in Munich as guests of Rodensky, the lead actor.
The Israelis received glasses of wine during the intermission and posed for pictures with Rodensky.

The last play in which Rodensky acted was "The Spine", which premiered on January 10, 1988 at the Habima Theatre. He played the role of Dr. Willy. The production ran for only seven performances and then was closed in deference to Rodensky's illness. Rodensky died the following year.

Film and television
Rodensky first appeared on screen in the 1935 Israeli film Zot Hi Ha'aretz (This is the Land). He was cast as Reb Pinchas in the Israeli film Shnei Kuni Lemel (The Flying Matchmaker), which was the Israeli entry for the Academy Award for Best Foreign Language Film in 1966. Other notable roles included Tevye in the 1968 Israeli film Tevye and His Seven Daughters, Simon Wiesenthal in the 1974 Anglo-German film The Odessa File, and Jethro in the BBC television miniseries Moses the Lawgiver. Rodensky appeared in other film and television roles in West Germany and Switzerland.

Honors and awards
Rodensky received numerous honors and awards in Israel and West Germany. In 1983 he received the Federal Service Cross from the Federal Republic of Germany, and the Rudolf Küstermeier Prize in Tel Aviv, the latter recognizing his contribution to "the interpretation of Israeli culture in West Germany".

Rodensky was named a Worthy Citizen of Tel Aviv in 1982. He received the Israel Prize for lifetime achievement in 1983 and the Meyer Margalit Prize in 1984.

President of Germany Gustav Heinemann praised Rodensky as "Israel's greatest ambassador of reconciliation".

Personal life

Rodensky met his wife, stage actress Raya Nura Shein, when both were studying at the Eretz Israel Theatre. They married in 1928.

Rodensky died of a heart attack in Tel Aviv on 16 July 1989. Notwithstanding his fame, he died impoverished.

In 2001-2002 the Tel Aviv Municipality affixed a memorial plaque to Rodensky's home at 1 Rachel Street as part of its effort to honor artists and intellectuals who had resided in the city.

Filmography

Sources:

Discography
Rodensky's recordings include:

Albums
Shmuel Rodensky Singt Lieder Seiner Heimat In Deutscher Sprache [Shmuel Rodensky Sings Songs of His Homeland in German Language] (1968)
Anatevka (Deutsche Originalaufnahme) (Anatevka original German-language recording) (1968)
 Shmuel Rodensky Liest Satiren Von Ephraim Kishon (Shmuel Rodensky Reads Satires by Ephraim Kishon) (1974)

Singles
Wenn Ich Einmal Reich Wär / Zum Wohl ["If I Were a Rich Man"] (1968)

Notes

References

Sources

External links

 
 Shmuel Rodensky and Shmuel Segal on the Lack of Human Logic" Hebrew-language comedy routine, 1984

1902 births
1989 deaths
People from Smarhon’
People from Oshmyansky Uyezd
Belarusian Jews
Jews from the Russian Empire
Polish emigrants to Mandatory Palestine
Ashkenazi Jews in Mandatory Palestine
Israeli people of Belarusian-Jewish descent
Israeli male stage actors
Israeli male film actors
Burials at Kiryat Shaul Cemetery